Patriarch Cosmas I may refer to:

 Patriarch Cosmas I of Alexandria, Greek Patriarch of Alexandria in 727–768
 Cosmas I of Constantinople, Ecumenical  Patriarch in 1075–1081